Back to the Hotel is the debut album by American rap group N2Deep, released June 23, 1992 on Profile Records. The album was produced by N2Deep and Jonny Z.   The only guests on the album were fellow Vallejo, California artists B-Legit and E-40. Along with singles, music videos were released for three songs: "Back to the Hotel", "Toss Up" and "The Weekend". "The Weekend" was directed by Michael Luccro.

Reception 

The album was a huge success for the group, peaking at number 55 on the Billboard 200, at number 29 on the Billboard Top R&B/Hip-Hop Albums and at number 1 on the Billboard Top Heatseekers.  The album also featured the very successful single "Back to the Hotel", which peaked at  number 14 on the Billboard Hot 100, at number 12 on the Billboard Rap Songs and performed well on several other charts as well. The mildly successful single "Toss-Up" peaked at number 92 on the Billboard Hot 100 and at number 74 on the Billboard Rap Songs.

Track listing

Samples
Back to the Hotel
"Darkest Light" by Lafayette Afro Rock Band
"Early in the Morning" by The Gap Band
Do Tha Crew 
"A Real Mother for Ya'" by Johnny Guitar Watson
Mack Daddyz
"Get Up, Stand Up" by Bob Marley and The Wailers
Shakedown
"Blues Dance Raid" by Steel Pulse

Chart history 
Album

Singles

End of year chart ("Back to the Hotel")

References

External links 
 [ Back to the Hotel] at AllMusic
 Back to the Hotel at Discogs
 Back to the Hotel at MusicBrainz
 Back to the Hotel at Tower Records

N2Deep albums
Jay Tee albums
1992 debut albums
Profile Records albums